F is a musical note, the fourth above C or fifth below C. It is the fourth note and the sixth semitone of the solfège. It is also known as fa in fixed-do solfège. It has enharmonic equivalents of E (E-sharp) and G (G-double flat), amongst others.

When calculated in equal temperament with a reference of A above middle C as 440 Hz, the frequency of Middle F (F4) is approximately 349.228 Hz. See pitch (music) for a discussion of historical variations in frequency.

Designation by octave

Scales

Common scales beginning on F
 F major: F G A B C D E F
 F natural minor: F G A B C D E F
 F harmonic minor: F G A B C D E F
 F melodic minor ascending: F G A B C D E F
 F melodic minor descending: F E D C B A G F

Diatonic scales
 F Ionian: F G A B C D E F
 F Dorian: F G A B C D E F
 F Phrygian: F G A B C D E F
 F Lydian: F G A B C D E F
 F Mixolydian: F G A B C D E F
 F Aeolian: F G A B C D E F
 F Locrian: F G A B C D E F

Jazz melodic minor
 F ascending melodic minor: F G A B C D E F
 F Dorian ♭2: F G A B C D E F
 F Lydian augmented: F G A B C D E F
 F Lydian dominant: F G A B C D E F
 F Mixolydian ♭6: F G A B C D E F
 F Locrian ♮2: F G A B C D E F
 F altered: F G A B C D E F

E-sharp

E is a common enharmonic equivalent of F, but is not regarded as the same note. E is commonly found before F in the same measure in pieces where F is in the key signature, in order to represent a diatonic, rather than a chromatic semitone; writing an F with a following F is regarded as a chromatic alteration of one scale degree. Though E and F sound the same in any 12-tone temperament, other tunings may define them as distinct pitches.

References

Bibliography

See also
 Piano key frequencies
 F major
 F minor
 Root (chord)
Musical notes